John McCormick may refer to:
John McCormick (political scientist) (born 1954), British professor of political science at Indiana University in the United States
John McCormick (Canadian politician) (1858–1936), Canadian merchant and politician in Nova Scotia, Canada
John McCormick (footballer, born 1936) (1936–2017), Scottish footballer
John McCormick (British politician) (1880s–1958), member of the Senate of Northern Ireland
John B. McCormick, American mechanical engineer
John D. McCormick, reporter for Bloomberg News and formerly the Chicago Tribune
John E. McCormick (1924–2010), American jurist and legislator
John F. McCormick, Coast Guard sailor, namesake of USCGC John F. McCormick
John P. McCormick (born 1950), American journalist for Newsweek and editor for the Chicago Tribune
John Rockefeller McCormick (1896–1901), American child victim of scarlet fever; grandson of John D. Rockefeller, his parents funded research for its cure
John McCormick (producer) (1893–1961), American producer and husband of film star Colleen Moore (1922–1930)
John W. McCormick (1831–1917), American politician and U.S. Representative from Ohio
John Wesley McCormick (1754–1837), American pioneer who homesteaded in Indiana and the namesake of McCormick's Creek State Park
John McCormick (American football) (1937–2013), former professional American football player
John McCormick (Australian footballer) (1899–1974), Australian rules footballer
John N. McCormick (1863–1939), bishop of Western Michigan in the Episcopal Church

See also
USCGC John F. McCormick, a Sentinel class cutter
John McCormack (disambiguation)